Martin Hewitt (born 24 July 1965) is an English former professional footballer who played as a centre forward.

Career
Born in Hartlepool, Hewitt played for St. James', Hartlepool United  and Billingham Synthonia.

Personal life
His son died in a car accident in October 2014.

References

1965 births
Footballers from Hartlepool
Living people
English footballers
Hartlepool United F.C. players
Billingham Synthonia F.C. players
English Football League players
Association football forwards